Clintamraceae is a family of smut fungi in the order Ustilaginales. The family is monotypic, containing the single genus Clintamra with the species Clintamra nolinae.

References

Ustilaginomycotina
Basidiomycota genera
Monotypic fungi genera